The 1998 Anaheim Angels season involved the Angels finishing 2nd in the American League west with a record of 85 wins and 77 losses.

Offseason
December 4, 1997: Greg Cadaret was signed as a free agent with the Anaheim Angels.
December 19, 1997: Cecil Fielder signed as a free agent with the Anaheim Angels.
December 22, 1997: Chip Hale signed as a free agent with the Anaheim Angels.
January 9, 1998: Norberto Martin was signed as a free agent with the Anaheim Angels.
January 10, 1998: William Van Landingham was signed as a free agent with the Anaheim Angels.
January 26, 1998: Damon Mashore was signed as a free agent with the Anaheim Angels.
February 27, 1998: Jack McDowell signed as a free agent with the Anaheim Angels.
March 30, 1998: Chip Hale was traded by the Anaheim Angels to the St. Louis Cardinals for Craig Shipley.

Regular season

Season standings

Record vs. opponents

Transactions
July 30, 1998: Charlie O'Brien was traded by the Chicago White Sox to the Anaheim Angels for Brian Tokarse (minors) and Jason Stockstill (minors).
August 7, 1998: Jeff Juden was selected off waivers by the Anaheim Angels from the Milwaukee Brewers.
August 10, 1998: Cecil Fielder was released by the Anaheim Angels.
August 26, 1998: Greg Cadaret was selected off waivers by the Texas Rangers from the Anaheim Angels.

Roster

Player stats

Starters by position

Note: Pos = Position; G = Games played; AB = At bats; R = Runs; H = Hits; HR = Home runs; RBI = Runs batted in; Avg. = Batting average; Slg. = Slugging Average; SB = Stolen bases

Other batters
Note: G = Games played; AB = At bats; H = Hits; Avg. = Batting average; HR = Home runs; RBI = Runs batted in

Starting pitchers
Note: G = Games pitched; IP = Innings pitched; W = Wins; L = Losses; ERA = Earned run average; SO = Strikeouts

Other pitchers
Note: G = Games pitched; IP = Innings pitched; W = Wins; L = Losses; ERA = Earned run average; SO = Strikeouts

Relief pitchers
Note: G = Games pitched; W = Wins; L = Losses; SV = Saves; ERA = Earned run average; SO = Strikeouts

Farm system

References

1998 Anaheim Angels at Baseball Reference
1998 Anaheim Angels at Baseball Almanac

Los Angeles Angels seasons
Anaheim Angels
Los